Wattignies is a commune in the Nord department of northern France. It lies in the south-western part of the Lille conurbation.

Neighboring communes
Lille, Faches-Thumesnil, Templemars, Seclin, Noyelles-lès-Seclin, Emmerin and Loos-lez-Lille.

Heraldry

Population

Twin towns
Wattignies is twinned with:
  Broadstairs,  United Kingdom – since 1982
  Rodenkirchen, Germany – since 1973

See also
Communes of the Nord department

References

External links

 Town council website

Communes of Nord (French department)
French Flanders